Biogon is the brand name of Carl Zeiss for a series of photographic camera lenses, first introduced in 1934. Biogons are typically wide-angle lenses.

History

The first lens branded Biogon (2.8 / 3.5 cm, unbalanced) was designed in 1934 by Ludwig Bertele, then assigned to Zeiss Ikon Dresden, the Contax created as a modification of the then Sonnar. It was developed by Carl Zeiss in approximately 1937 and manufactured in Jena, then a redesign in Oberkochen. 

In 1951, a new Biogon with a 90° angle of view (Super Wide Angle) was designed, also by Ludwig Bertele. The advent of the Biogon opened the way to extreme wide-angle lenses. The first examples were produced from 1954 as the 4.5 / 21 mm for Contax, in 1954, 4.5 / 38 mm for Hasselblad Super Wide, and from 1955 to 1956 as the 4.5 / 53 mm and 4.5 / 75 mm for the Linhof. The original patent spanned three different variants, each with a different maximum aperture: 6.3, 4.5, and 3.4 lenses.

Examples

Since their introduction, lenses branded Biogon are usually approximately symmetrical ("semi-symmetrical") wide-angle design with a usable angle of view of 90° or more. At 90° the focal length is approximately half as long as the format's diagonal.

Well known camera manufacturers like Hasselblad have or had Biogon derived lenses to offer.

The lenses branded Super-Angulon (sold by Schneider Kreuznach and Leica Camera) are based on the construction of the Biogon.
 Biogon 1:2,8 f = 21 mm, 90° angle (PDF-File; 65 kB)
 Biogon 1:4,5 f = 21 mm, T* Classic, 90° angle (PDF-File; 282 kB)
 Biogon 1:2,8 f = 25 mm, 82° angle (PDF-File; 292 kB)
 Biogon 1:2,8 f = 28 mm, 75° angle (PDF-File; 182 kB)
 Biogon 1:2,0 f = 35 mm, 63° angle (PDF-File; 266 kB)
 Biogon 1:4,5 f = 38 mm CFi for Hasselblad (Medium Format; PDF-File; 166 kB)
 Biogon 1:4,5 f = 53 mm,  image diameter of 115 mm, for professional cameras up to the 6 × 9 cm
 Biogon 1:5,6 f = 60 mm for Hasselblad (Medium Format, including the Apollo moon mission, PDF file, 857 kB); PDF-File; 857 kB)
 Biogon 1:4,5 f = 75 mm,  image diameter of 153 mm, 92° angle, for large-format professional cameras up to 4 × 5 inches

Other Zeiss lenses include the Triotar, Biotar, Biometar, Tessar, Planar, Sonnar, Hologon,  Topogon, Kipronar, Prokinar.

See also
Biotar
Tessar
Planar
Sonnar

Hologon

References

Bibliography

External links
 Detailed article about the history of super wide-angle lenses, starting with Hypergon (Italian)
 Biogon wide-angle lens article on olypedia.de (German)
 Historical Data sheets of Zeiss lenses (German)

Photographic lens designs
Zeiss lenses